Stanisław Żytkowski (1 January 1948 – 16 September 2022) was a Polish lawyer and politician. A member of the Solidarity Citizens' Committee and later the Democratic Union, he served in the Senate of Poland from 1989 to 1991.

Żytkowski died in Gorzów Wielkopolski on 16 September 2022, at the age of 74.

References

1948 births
2022 deaths
Democratic Union (Poland) politicians
Freedom Union (Poland) politicians
Polish lawyers
Members of the Senate of Poland 1989–1991
Recipients of Cross of Freedom and Solidarity
Adam Mickiewicz University in Poznań alumni
People from Gorzów Wielkopolski